Cass Township is one of seventeen townships in Boone County, Iowa, USA.  As of the 2000 census, its population was 668.

History
Cass Township was established in 1858. It is named for Lewis Cass.

Geography
According to the USGS, it contains two cemeteries: Liberty and State Hospital.

References

External links
 US-Counties.com
 City-Data.com

Townships in Boone County, Iowa
Townships in Iowa
1858 establishments in Iowa